Buffum is a surname. Notable people with the surname include:

Arnold Buffum (1782-1859), Quaker abolitionist
Arnold Buffum Chace (1845-1932), American businessman and academic administrator
Charles Abel Buffum (1870–1936), American businessman and politician
Dorothy Buffum Chandler (1901-1997), American cultural leader
Edward Gould Buffum (1820–1867), American philanthropist, son of Arnold Buffum.
Elizabeth Buffum Chace (1806–1899), American activist. She was the daughter of Arnold Buffum.
James N. Buffum (1807–1887), American politician
John Buffum (born 1943), American rally driver
Lillie Buffum Chace Wyman (1847–1929), American social reformer
Robert Buffum (1828-1871), American Union Army soldier
Thomas Buffum (1776–1852), Justice of the Rhode Island Supreme Court
William B. Buffum (1921–2012), American diplomat

See also
 Buffum, an American automobile.
 Buffums, a former chain of department stores in California, owned by Charles A. Buffum and his brother Edwin E. Buffum.